Lloyd Stanton is a British film producer. In 2013, he produced a low-budget film, Wizard's Way, which won a LOCO Discovery Award and was optioned by Jack Black. In 2015, he directed and produced the film Dying Laughing starring Kevin Hart, Chris Rock, Jerry Seinfeld and Sarah Silverman.

References 

Living people
British film producers
Year of birth missing (living people)